Ajdabiya–Kufra road is an asphalt road in Libya running from Ajdabiya to Kufra. The road is essential for traffic from and to Awjila, Jalu, Jikharra, and Kufra oases. However, some parts of the road are in bad condition. Between Jalu and Kufra (584 km apart), there is no significant human settlement.

The Ajdabiya–Awjila section was built from 1973–1975.

The Awjila–Kufra section was completed between 1976 and 1980.

References
Libyan Planning Ministry, “Al Khutta Ath Thulathiya lit Tanmiya al  Iqtisadiya wal Ijtima’iya”, 1973-1975.
Libyan Planning Ministry, “Khutta at Tahawul al  Iqtisadi wal Ijtima’i”, Al Matba’a al Asriya, Tripoli, 1976-1980.

Roads in Libya
Al Wahat District
Kufra District
Ajdabiya